Brookside Stadium is a natural amphitheatre stadium located in Cleveland, Ohio used for baseball, softball and American football and was the home of World Amateur Championship games in the early 20th century. Most notable were three games on September 20, 1914, October 3, 1915, and October 10, 1915 that attracted the largest recorded crowds in amateur sports history.

Brief history
The natural amphitheatre that makes up what is now Brookside Stadium, and moreover lands throughout all of Brookside Park, can be credited to a fortunate set of geological circumstances; ancient glaciers retreating to carve a deep bowl from the earth. This fertile valley lands would have been transversed by early Native American visitors, farmed by the regions first white settlers, and eventually part of the original purchase to establish the Cleveland Metroparks system in 1894.

In the years that follow, we have documentation that Brookside Stadium was "enjoyed by the lovers of outdoor amusements" and had already begun hosting large audiences. Plans had begun to develop "an athletic field of several acres…which would be ready for use during the coming season" and in June 1898, Brookside Park hosted a what was referred to as a "season-opening band concert" of the Great Western Band that found "all the West and South Side" turning out to hear it.

Plans to develop Brookside 
In October 1908, Cleveland City Clerk Peter Witt made a presentation to the Cleveland Athletic Club, suggesting to the Club's membership that Brookside Park needed an athletic complex to take advantage of the gift of the natural terrain. Witt envisioned a 100,000 seat stadium that would be the "largest meeting place in the world" to attract the 1912 Olympic Games.

The plan was to begin with seating for 25,000 eventually expanding to encompass the entire hillside and surround a 750-foot by 500-foot athletic field. In fact, expecting this grandiose vision to be embraced, by the time Peter Witt was making his appeal to the Athletic Club, the hillsides had already been graded and leveled by the City's parks department. By the end of November 1908, Witt had made the official announcement that the first section of concrete seating would be installed and within a year the "mammoth" stadium would be complete. Sadly only a portion of this plan would be realized, and never to the extent that would have attracted the Olympic Games.

Early years
Anecdotal evidence suggests that Brookside Stadium has been in continuous use since around 1894 - 1896. Regardless of discussions of elaborate infrastructure improvements, we do know that on May 2, 1909, Brookside Stadium hosted a double-header for opening day of the Cleveland League, the first game between the Ohio A C's versus the Commadores and the second between McWatters-Dolan and the Treadways.

The official dedication ceremonies of Brookside Stadium took place on May 29, 1909 and consisted of a 15-mile City Marathon originating in Gordon Park and finishing on the main field, other track and field competitions (shot put, pole vaulting, etc.) involving 152 participants representing 12 gymnasiums, an act by Minnie the Brookside elephant who performed between events, and a concert from Rossini's band who "sent waltzes and two steps singing through the air". The thousands that lined the hillsides were seated on a "circus-like" arrangement of wooden bench seating that outlined the field.

Notable games

Though it was not widely covered, it is understood that Brookside Stadium likely held a number of sporting events over the next several years. This was especially likely noting the popularity of amateur league baseball, the prevalence of local teams, and the reputation that Brookside had would have garnered as a premier field. Such interested would culminate in 1914 and 1915, when Brookside Stadium would host three games, all amateur championships, that would mark it forever as a historical ballpark.

On Sunday, September 20, 1914, the Telling Strollers beat Hanna's Cleaners (aka the Hanna Street Cleaners) 8 to 3 in front of an estimated audience of 100,000 (printed attendance of 90,000 to 100,000).

On Sunday, October 3, 1915, White Autos played Johnstown, PA to a crowd of 100,000 on-lookers.

But it was the final game of the season on Sunday, October 10, 1915, that found White Autos beating Omaha Lexus 11 to 6 in front of an estimated crowd of 115,000 that has drawn the greatest amount of interest and put Brookside Stadium on the map for sports fans worldwide.

These matches, sponsored by local businesses, were free to the public and would have drawn attendees from all sides of the city. In fact the greatest barrier to marking Brookside Stadium as the home of the largest event in amateur, and possibly in the entirety of sports history, is the absence of a formal accounting of this attendance. The best historical record remains these four impressive panoramic photographs with dates and an estimated number of attendees inscribed.

Brookside Stadium hosted other baseball games with high attendances, including one on September 20, 1914.  It also hosted professional football games

Later years
Over the next decade, Brookside Stadium would host a number of events, from semi-pro football games, to community gatherings  and event a concert by the world famous John Philip Sousa Band in 1917. As professional baseball continued to gain popularity, and economic times changed, Brookside would have become a more informal place for sporting matches that would include youth league play and practice. Ultimately over the next half-century, the Stadiums infrastructure would erode and due to the lack of investment, the field would fall into disrepair.

In the early 1980s, a number of dedicated group of citizens (many of whom were descendants of those who played at Brookside during the legendary days of played there themselves) lobbied Cleveland City Council and the City of Cleveland to completely rehabilitate the Stadium and have the park accepted by the Landmarks Commission as an Historical Site. Unfortunately their effort faced great odds and Brookside Stadium, then known only as "Diamond #1", was eliminated from regular city play (and funding) and in consideration to become a parking lot for the Cleveland Metroparks Zoo.

During the reconstruction of the Fulton Road Bridge in 2007, Brookside Stadium was used as a staging ground for materials and equipment by the Kokosing Construction Company, which caused significant damage. Upon completion of the bridge, the field was backfilled with clay and spread with grass, leaving it in very poor drainage and ultimately in an unplayable state as it lies today.

The future of Brookside
Similar to many ballparks across North America, Brookside Stadium lies in slumber as a remnant of sports history and only a shadow of its former glory. Its past grandeur is recalled today only by the tale of elderly Clevelanders, or in faint references within history books. But the iconographic image that many have seen of what could be the largest attendance in all of sports leaves Brookside Stadium with a legendary story to be told, and an endangered ballpark to be brought back to life.

Thanks to recent efforts led by the Brookside Stadium Preservation Society, plans are being made to renovate Brookside Stadium and restore the stadium to playable, and better yet, historic condition. An important part of this work will be collecting the history of the ballpark as told by area residents and their descendants.

External links
 Brookside Stadium Preservation Society

References

Sports venues in Cleveland
Defunct baseball venues in the United States
Defunct American football venues in the United States
Defunct sports venues in Ohio